KKNW (1150 AM) is a commercial radio station licensed to serve Seattle, Washington.  The station is owned by Hubbard Broadcasting, Inc., and features a talk radio format.  KKNW mostly airs call-in and discussion shows where the host pays the station for the air time, known in the radio industry as "brokered time".  Shows range from personal growth, health, psychology and pet care to Chinese, Italian and Russian language shows.  Nationally syndicated hosts are heard overnight, including family financial adviser Clark Howard and progressive talk host Stephanie Miller.  Many hours begin with national news from NBC News Radio. It is also the home of Washington Huskies women's basketball.

A transmitter site for the station is in Mercer Slough Nature Park in Bellevue.  KKNW's studios are located in the Newport Corporate Center, also in Bellevue.

History
KKNW first began in 1927  as KRSC, with the call sign standing for Kelvinator Radio Sales Corporation.  Under the ownership of Jessica Longston, it became KAYO in 1953 and was a top 40 station from the late 1950s until 1961, when it changed to MOR.

It then went back to top 40 for 60 days in 1962 before flipping to a long-running country music format and was a competitor to KMPS (now KKOL) and KQIN (now KGNW). In 1980, the station flipped to a news/talk format after it was sold to Obie Broadcasting. In 1982, the station flipped to adult contemporary and became known as KSPL. KSPL changed call letters to KGNW on September 19, 1984, and became a religious outlet under Salem Communications ownership. On December 31, 1986, KGNW moved to its current home at 820 AM, while 1150 AM was sold to Park Communications and began simulcasting the adult album alternative format of KEZX-FM (now KPNW-FM) as KEZX.

On April 20, 1987, KEZX dropped from the FM simulcast and flipped to new age/classical music, which would then give way to another simulcast with KEZX-FM on April 1, 1988. In 1989, KEZX flipped to "Business Radio 1150", which aired business talk programming. Sandusky Radio bought the station in 1996. On January 13, 1999, the station flipped to classic R&B as KSRB. The programming was predominantly satellite-fed through ABC Radio's The Touch Network.

On June 1, 2001, at 6 a.m., the station flipped to all-news as "NewsChannel 1150", and changed call letters to KKNW, which carried the audio portion of CNN Headline News. In the mid-2000s, the station shifted its programming to an "alternative talk" format featuring mostly local shows.

In July 2013, Sandusky announced it would sell its radio holdings in Seattle and Phoenix, Arizona to Hubbard Broadcasting. The sale was completed that November. It is co-owned in the Seattle market with four other Hubbard stations, adult standards 880 KIXI, contemporary hit radio 92.5 KQMV, adult album alternative 98.9 KPNW-FM and adult contemporary 106.9 KRWM.

References

External links
FCC History Cards for KKNW
1150 KKNW
Hubbard Radio's 1150 KKNW

KNW
News and talk radio stations in the United States
Radio stations established in 1972
Hubbard Broadcasting
Progressive talk radio